"Animal" is a song by Argentine singers María Becerra and Cazzu. It was written by Becerra, Cazzu and Enzo Sauthier, and produced by Big One. The song was released on 7 January 2022 as the lead single from Becerra’s debut studio album, Animal.

The song is featured on the album’s first part and extended play (EP) Animal, Pt. 1.

Background

In 28 December 2020 María Becerra began teasing the song in her social medias with a series of emojis and photos from the video of "Animal". In 3 January 2021 Becerra announced the release of the song alongside a teaser video for the song. 
The song was officially released on 7 January of that year.

Chart performance

In Argentina, the song debuted at number 19 on the Billboard Argentina Hot 100 during the tracking week of 16 January 2021. On its third week, the song reached the top ten. The following week, the song reach its final peak at number 5, becoming Becerra’s second top 5 in the chart. The song would spend 28 weeks on the chart.

Music video

The music video for "Animal" was directed by Julián Levy and was released simultaneously with the song on 7 January 2021. As of December 2022, the song has a accumulated a total of 126M views.

Charts

References

2021 singles
2021 songs
María Becerra songs
Spanish-language songs